Lord Green may refer to:

 Andrew Green, Baron Green of Deddington (born 1941), British diplomat
 Stephen Green, Baron Green of Hurstpierpoint (born 1948), British politician

See also
 Wilfred Greene, 1st Baron Greene (1883-1952), British lawyer and judge